Bauskas Dzīve is a regional newspaper published in Latvia.

Bauska
Newspapers published in Latvia